Malyshko is a surname. Notable people with the surname include:

 Andriy Malyshko (1912–1970), Soviet and Ukrainian poet, translator, and literary critic
 Dmitry Malyshko (born 1987), Russian biathlete